Krystina Alogbo (born January 20, 1986) is a Canadian water polo player. She was a member of the Women's Nation Team, which claimed the bronze medal at the 2005 World Aquatics Championships in Montreal, Quebec.

See also
 List of World Aquatics Championships medalists in water polo

References

External links
 

1986 births
Living people
Canadian female water polo players
Water polo players from Montreal
Water polo players at the 2007 Pan American Games
Water polo players at the 2011 Pan American Games
World Aquatics Championships medalists in water polo
Pan American Games silver medalists for Canada
Black Canadian sportspeople
Pan American Games medalists in water polo
Water polo players at the 2015 Pan American Games
Water polo players at the 2019 Pan American Games
Medalists at the 2011 Pan American Games
Medalists at the 2015 Pan American Games
Medalists at the 2019 Pan American Games
Black Canadian sportswomen